Traditional Spelling Revised (TSR) is an English-language spelling reform
alternative to the semi-regular conventional English orthography (EO). TSR is a relatively conservative scheme. It seeks to identify the underlying rules of EO but to apply them more consistently, thereby reducing the number of irregularities that must be memorized. TSR makes it possible to predict pronunciation from spelling, if not always the reverse. Words are only respelled when they cannot be brought within the rules.

TSR was approved by the International English Spelling Congress (IESC)  in March 2021 as the preferred alternative to EO. The English Spelling Society, sponsor of the Congress, is affording TSR a degree of support and publicity. During the current review period (five years), no major changes will likely happen. However, on the basis of comments received, it is possible there may be some modest modifications during that period.

TSR has been mentioned in the media.

What TSR retains 
TSR uses the standard Latin alphabet, most of the letters and combinations of letters in TSR are pronounced in the same way as in EO (English orthography), and with the same stress. 

To a large extent, the rules are preserved:

 (Magic e) The letter e at the end of a word is not pronounced, but changes the pronunciation of other letters (lengthening the vowel). This happens in combination (vowel + consonant + e) – for example, in the word like.
 (Doubling rule) If a monosyllabic word ends with the combination short vowel + consonant, then when an ending (for example, -ed, -ing) is added to the word, the consonant is doubled. Examples: swim turns to swimming, but: fail turns to failed, because here the vowel is not short. In polysyllabic words, if a stressed vowel is followed by one consonant + another vowel, the previous vowel is usually lengthened: sad / sadist, set / scenic, bit / biter, fun / fuming.

If in EO a letter or letters can denote more than one sound, the rules for predicting pronunciation are usually preserved and systematized. Also, some suffixes and other common combinations that do not fully comply with the basic rules of EO, but unambiguously determine pronunciation, are preserved from EO.

Entirely retained (despite discrepancy with TSR rules):

 personal pronouns and adjectives: I. you, he, she, we, me, us, they, your, their(s), them;
 variations of verbs to be and to have: are, was, were, have, having;
 names of numbers, days of the week, months and seasons of the year;
 demonstrative adjectives, pronouns and adverbs: than, that, then, thence, there, these, this, those, thus;
 interrogative pronouns: what, where, who, whose.

A few common words are also preserved

 the, of, to(day), any(one), (n)either, nothing, some, woman, women, yes.

What TSR changes 
In TSR, the spelling of a word changes from EO if it either does not conform to the basic rules (EO or TSR) or is ambiguous. The main categories of changes are listed below.

 Fix the incorrect application of the Doubling rule. Example: accommodate → .
 To indicate the place of stress, in some cases, a consonant is deliberately doubled in the middle of a word: ex. deddicate, edducate, perrish.
 Correcting the incorrect application of the rules for the pronunciation of the letter s - it is pronounced as /s/ (not /z/) in the following cases:
 at the beginning of a word (e.g. snake);
 before or after the letters /k/, /f/, /p/, /t/ (e.g. clicks, cliffs, clips, its);
 as part of the prefixes dis- or mis- (e.g. dismay, misrule);
 after the prefix con-, per- (e.g. consent, persistent);
 in compound words consisting of two full-fledged words like homesick, ransack.

 If the above conditions are not met, then s can be doubled to preserve the /s/ sound, for example: miss, mass, missing, or the spelling of the word can be changed to match the pronunciation. Some consoles can be separated by a hyphen to provide the /s/ sound, for example: re-send, co-signatory. In other cases, s is usually pronounced /z/.

 Disambiguation for letter combinations, which in EO can indicate more than one sound. For example, the combination "ow" represents completely different sounds in the words low and town, so, for the sake of unambiguity, TSR uses "ow" only for the // sound and accordingly rewrites the spelling of some words: low → lo, own → oan.
 Remove redundant letters, for example: (w)rong, (g)nash, (h)our. To distinguish homophones, in some cases, an apostrophe is used: ex.  'our(hour), 'rite(write), 'no(know). The silent e at the end of a word is omitted if the preceding vowel is short: love → luv', dove → duv, verb live → liv. (However, "office" retains its final "e", because it shows pronunciation of soft C.)
 Two new letter combinations have been introduced: "aa" and "uu". ex. faather, buuk.

Spelling patterns for vowel sounds

TSR has its own spelling patterns for each phoneme, as well as Regspel. However, TSR allows for some exceptions.

In TSR, "ea"/iː/ doesn't indicate /eɪ/ or /ɛ/. great → grait, weapon → weppon.
In TSR, "ow"/aʊ/ doesn't indicate /oʊ/. low→lo, show→sho.
TSR distinguishes /juː/ and "oo"/uː/. Blue becomes bloo. Truth becomes trooth.
TSR distinguishes "oo"/uː/ and "uu"/ʊ/. Book becomes buuk. Push becomes puush.

For details, please visit TSR Full Guidance page.

Features

TSR is mostly conservative, but occasionally radical. Shown below is not everything. For more, visit TRADITIONAL SPELLING REVISED FULL GUIDANCE.

TSR largely retains the so-called Magic E and Doubling Rules to indicate vowel length.
Final <e> is generally omitted when the preceding vowel is short: <dove> becomes <duv>, <live> (verb int.) becomes <liv>.
TSR corrects instances where the doubling rule has been misapplied by TS – <committee>→<>, <accommodate>→<>.
TSR makes no special provision for stress. However, attack becomes , because "a" before "tt" doesn't have stress. Doubled consonants show stress location.(ex. edducate, perrish)
TSR retains some irregular spellings such as proper nouns, common irregular words, and loan words. 
Common suffixes (such as -tion, -cial, and -sure) are also retained.
The past tense suffix "-ed" is retained. ex. "stopped", not "stopt".
TSR retains some letter sequences even if they are irregular. They are called "sub-groups": (talk, walk), (taste, waste), (benign, sign), (find, mind), (old, gold), (folk, yolk), (could, would), (brother, mother), (warm, warn), (worm, worst).
TSR removes redundant letters. However, easy not 'esy', high not hi, letter not letr, lie not li, pack not pak, stopped not stopd, switch not swich.
Silent "g" is retained as in "benign", "design", and "sign". The "g" in "gnash" is omitted.
Silent "gh" is mostly retained(high, bough, bought, eight). However, "though" becomes "tho", and "through" becomes "throo", not "thru".
Change "gh"/f/ to "ff"(coff, enuff, laff).
Retain "ph"/f/(phone).
"Th" is used for both /θ/ and /ð/. (think, that)
Some phonemes have several different spelling patterns, which helps to distinguish homophones visually. ex. main, mane, buy, by, bye, cite, site, sight.
The apostrophe, and hyphen / diaresis are occasionally used to assist distinguish homophones & predicting the pronunciation of some vowel combinations. ex. 'hole(whole), 'our(hour), cre-ate(create), creäte(create).

Homophones in TSR 

In TSR, there are cases in which spellings of homophones will not merge.  (e.g. stare / stair, sight / site / cite, none / nun, scene / seen, tail / tale)

Bear turns to bair, to dintinguish from bare.

Great turns to grait, to distinguish from grate.

However, it doesn't differenciate or / ore / oar.  Neither does pore / pour. 

Hour becomes our by using an apostrophe.Blue becomes bloo, and blew becomes blooh with an h.

"Father" or "faather"?
The word "aunt" can have /æ/ & /ɑː/. TSR retains this spelling because it may belong to "The 'bath' words".

The word "rather" can have /æ/ & /ɑː/. TSR retains this spelling because it may belong to "The 'bath' words".

However, "father" becomes "faather", which has the /ɑː/ sound, not /æ/. 

TSR retains "aunt", "brother", and "mother". However, it does not retain "father".

The "aa" grapheme is quite rare in TSR. "Calm" stays the same.

 "Change" or "chainge"? 
Formerly, TSR retained the spelling of "change".1000 most common words transcribed into TSR However, according to Traditional Spelling Revised Full Guidance, "change" becomes "chainge".
 
 "Ch" with /k/ sound 
TSR is supposed to retain "ch" with /k/ sound when it is related to Greek. However, these words are respelled:

character → carracter
technology → tecnology, (or "tecnollogy"?)
("School" remains the same.)

 Wider use of "ss" in TSR 
There are cases where TSR uses the "ss" to indicate the /s/ sound. Occasionally, not conservative.

base → baisscase → caissclose (adj) → cloassdefense → defenssgas → gasshouse → houssincrease → increassinside → insside
listen  → lissen
loose → loossnecessary → nessessary
personal → perssonal
purpose → purposssense → senssuse (noun) → uess''
("Yes" remains the same.)

 Example text Gettysburg Address'''
Fourscor and seven years ago our faathers brought forth, on this continent, a new nation, conceeved in libberty and deddicated to the proposition that all men are creäted equal. Now we are engaged in a grait civil war, testing whether that nation, or any nation so conceeved, and so deddicated, can long endure. We are met on a grait battle-feeld in that war. We have cum to deddicate a portion of that feeld, as a final resting place for those who here gave their lives, that that nation might liv. It is altogether fitting and propper that we should do this, but in a larger senss we cannot deddicate, we cannot consecrate, we cannot hallo this ground. The brave men, living and ded, who struggled here, have consecrated it far abuv our poor power to add or detract. The world will little note, nor long remember, what we say here, but it can nevver forget what they did here. It is for us the living, rather, to be deddicated to the grait task remaining befor us that from these onored ded we take increassed devotion to that cause for which they gave the last fuul mesure of devotion - that we here highly resolv that these ded shall not have died in vain, that this nation, under God, shall have a new birth of freedom, and that guvernment of the peeple, by the peeple, for the peeple, shall not perrish from the erth.

Notes and references

See also 
English Spelling Society
List of reforms of the English language
Cut Spelling
Handbook of Simplified Spelling
SoundSpel
SR1
Regularized Inglish
Phonological history of English close back vowels

External links 
Spelling Society Home page 2022-06-14
International English Spelling Congress 2022-06-14
ENGLISH SPELLING SOCIETY Personal View 23 TRADITIONAL SPELLING REVISED by Stephen Linstead
ENGLISH SPELLING SOCIETY Personal View 15 REGSPEL (2014)
 Scheme: Traditional Spelling Revised (TSR) Author: Stephen Linstead Brief Summary  2022-06-14
Traditional Spelling Revised by Stephen Linstead  2022-06-14
1000 most common words transcribed into TSR  2022-06-14
TRADITIONAL SPELLING REVISED FULL GUIDANCE  2022-06-14
English accents and their implications for spelling reform J.C. Wells, University College London  2022-08-16 accessed

English spelling reform
Orthography reform